Edville Gerhardt Abbott (November 6, 1871 – August 27, 1938) was an American orthopedic surgeon, orthotist and inventor.  

Abbott was recognized for pioneering a new treatment of lateral curvature of the spine (scoliosis), creating the first modern scoliosis brace and for co-founding a  worldwide famous children's hospital for crippled children with scoliosis in Portland, Maine.

Early life
Abbott  was born in Hancock, Maine. on November 6, 1871, the second child of Alonzo and Maria B. (Mercer) Abbott,  He attended the public schools of Hancock and then went to the East Maine Conference Seminary in Bucksport, Maine, where he graduated in 1889. For the next six years, Abbott worked with his father and brother in the granite business, supervising their quarries on Mt. Desert Island.

Medical career
In 1895, Abbott entered medical school at Bowdoin College, from which he graduated in 1898. He was then appointed house physician at the Maine General Hospital, where he served one year.  In 1899, Abbott spent time in Boston and New York City studying orthopedic surgery. He then spent a year studying at the Friedrich-Wilhelms-Universität in Berlin, Germany.

Returning to the U. S. in 1901, Abbott opened an office in Portland, Maine to practices orthopedic surgery..  During this period, he re-entered Bowdoin College to obtain a  Bachelor of Arts.  Concentrating on literature, Abbott received a MA degree two years later. In 1908, Abbott co-founded with  Harold A. Pingree and Frank W. Lamb the worldwide famous children's hospital for crippled children. 

Abbott pioneered a non-surgical treatment of lateral curvature of the spine (scoliosis). In 1913, he successfully demonstrated results of his method at an orthopedic congress in Berlin, Germany and England and elsewhere in Europe. He was named a "Genius of Orthopaedics" by international colleagues.

In 1917, Abbott created the first effective modern plastic scoliosis brace from celluloid. 

During his career, Abbott was surgeon-in-chief at the Children's Hospital in Portland, orthopedic surgeon to the Maine General Hospital; visiting surgeon to St. Barnabas Hospital in Portland; consulting surgeon to the Sisters' Hospital in Waterville, Maine and instructor in orthopedic surgery in the Maine Medical School. He was a member of  American Orthopedic
Association, Deutsche Orthopedische Gesellschaft, Societe International de Chirurgie, Societe Francaise D'Orthopedie.

Other interests
Abbott was a member of several Greek letter fraternities, a member of the Cumberland County Medical Society, the Maine Medical Association, American Medical Association, He was a director in the Fidelity Trust Company, member of the Board of Trade, and connected with various corporations. In politics he was a staunch Republican.

Abbott was also an Assistant Sec'y of The Maine Association Opposed to Suffrage for Women. He was a member of the Board of Managers of the Female Orphan Asylum, Vice President of the Portland District Nursing Association of Portland, member of Parish House Committee of State Street Church, member Parish Banquets Committee of State Street Church, Chairman of Hospital Committee of the Madelyn Shaw Fruit and Flower Fund, Children's Hospital.

Abbott died on August 27, 1938.  He is buried at Evergreen Cemetery in Portland, Maine.

Terms
Abbott's method — treatment of scoliosis by lateral pulling and counterpulling on the spinal column by means of wide bandages and pads, until the deformity is over-corrected, and then applying a plaster jacket to produce pressure, counterpressure, and fixation of the spine in its correct position.

Abott's Sign — the obvious lateral curvature of the spine, when physically observed at the back part of a patient suffering from scoliosis.

References
 
The American Illustrated Medical Dictionary (Philadelphia and London, 1938)  

"Genealogical and Family History of the STATE OF MAINE. (1909)"                                                    (http://www.dunhamwilcox.net/me/me_bio_abbott.htm)
"Making Cripples Straight ..." Page3&5, December 3, 1911.  The New York Times. 
"E. G. ABBOTT SCOLIOSIS: First Paper. The Physiological Postures of the Spine and
Their Relations to Scoliosis." The Journal of Bone and Joint Surgery Am. 1917;s2-15:26-50.
"Einladung zum XII. der Kongress der Deutschen Orthopadischen Gesellschaft. Zwolfter Kongress abgehatten zu Berlin am 24. und 25. Marz 1913".  Verlag von Ferdinand Enke.1913.
Portland City Guide. 1940. p. 253 (See: point 96. The Children's Hospital,68  High St.,)
"'Harold' error sets a rumor mill in action"  The Portland Press Herald. July 23, 2010
WHO'S WHO AMONG NORTH AMERICAN AUTHORS VOL - IV 1929 - 1930 (1921) Edited by Alberta Lawrence, GOLDAN SYNDICATE PUBLISHING COMPANY. Los Angeles. California.
"Who's who in New England" (1916) Publisher: Chicago : A.N. Marquis&Company

1871 births
1938 deaths
American orthopedic surgeons
Bowdoin College alumni
People from Portland, Maine
People from Hancock, Maine
Physicians from Maine
Burials at Evergreen Cemetery (Portland, Maine)
East Maine Conference Seminary alumni